Denis Lenoir (born 1949) is a French cinematographer, whose credits include Uprising, The Clearing, and Thursday.

He started as second assistant operator for L'insolent (1973).

Selected filmography
Sotelo (1976, short/Raoul Ruiz)
Dog's Dialogue (1976, short)
Laissé inachevé à Tokyo (1982, short/Olivier Assayas)
Les veufs (1983, short/Patrick Dewolf)
Winston Tong en studio (1984, short/Assayas)
L'amour propre ne le reste jamais très longtemps (1985/Martin Veyron)
Beau fixe (1992)
Carrington (1995)
An Air So Pure (1997)
Demonlover (2002)
Boomtown (2002)
The Clearing (2004)
Control (2004)
Entre ses mains (2005)
Time Bomb (2006)
Paris, je t'aime (2006) (segment "14th arrondissement")
88 Minutes (2007)
Angel (2007)
Righteous Kill (2008)
The Vintner's Luck (2009)
Carlos (2010)
La belle endormie (2010)
Tous les soleils (2011)
So Undercover (2012)
The Ultimate Accessory (2013)
Before the Winter Chill (2013)
Eden (2014)
Still Alice (2014)
Une Enfance (2015)
Things to Come (2016)
Three Christs (2017)
Wasp Network (2019)
Bergman Island (2021)
One Fine Morning (2022)

External links
 

1949 births
Living people
Cinematographers from Paris